Dehalobacter restrictus is a species of bacteria in the phylum Bacillota. It is strictly anaerobic and reductively dechlorinates tetra- and trichloroethene. It does not form spores; it is a small, gram-positive rod with one lateral flagellum. PER-K23 is its type strain.

Its name is Latin for “restricted”, referring to the limited substrate range utilized.

References

Further reading

External links

LSPN
Type strain of Dehalobacter restrictus at BacDive -  the Bacterial Diversity Metadatabase

Peptococcaceae
Bacteria described in 1998